Norbert Falk, also credited as Fred Orbing, (5 November 1872, Weißkirchen - 16 September 1932, Berlin) was an Austrian journalist and writer, most notable as a screenwriter for German films made under the Weimar Republic, such as Madame Dubarry (1919), Anna Boleyn (1920), Rosita (1923) and Der Kongreß tanzt (1931).

Works

Books

Selected filmography
 Carmen (1918)
 A Waltz Dream (1925)
 The Loves of Casanova (1927)
 The White Slave (1927)
 Orient (1928)
 Pawns of Passion (1928)
 The Case of Prosecutor M (1928)
 Secrets of the Orient (1928)
 The Last Night (1928)
 Two Worlds (1930)
 Congress Dances (1932)

Bibliography
 Kay Weniger: Das große Personenlexikon des Films, Volume 2, p 609. Berlin (2001)

External links 

 Norbert Falk on filmportal.de
 Norbert Falk - short biography

1872 births
1932 deaths
Austrian journalists
Austrian male screenwriters
20th-century Austrian screenwriters
20th-century Austrian male writers